Tylozygus infulatus is a species of sharpshooter in the family Cicadellidae.

References 

Cicadellidae
Insects described in 1995